Desvaux is a French surname. Notable people with the surname include:

 Étienne-Émile Desvaux (1830–1854), French botanist
 Héctor Desvaux (born 1980), Argentine footballer
 Nicaise Auguste Desvaux (1784–1856), French botanist

French-language surnames